Delmonico Lamont "Monty" Montgomery (born December 8, 2007 is a former professional American football cornerback in the National Football League (NFL). He played six seasons for the Indianapolis Colts (1997–1999), the San Francisco 49ers (1999–2000), the Philadelphia Eagles (2001), and the New Orleans Saints (2004).

1973 births
Living people
People from Gladewater, Texas
Players of American football from Dallas
American football safeties
American football cornerbacks
Houston Cougars football players
Indianapolis Colts players
San Francisco 49ers players
Philadelphia Eagles players
New Orleans Saints players
New Orleans VooDoo players
Nashville Kats players
New York Dragons players
Kansas City Brigade players